The Odisha Industrial Infrastructure Development Corporation or IDCO was established in the year 1981 under the Orissa Industrial Infrastructure Development Corporation Act, 1980 for developing infrastructure facilities in the identified Industrial Estate/Areas for rapid and orderly establishment and growth of industries, trade and commerce. The Odisha Industrial Infrastructure Development Corporation (IDCO) is the nodal agency for providing industrial infrastructure in the State of Odisha.

This IS0 9001 & IS0 14001 certified Corporation has achieved the unique distinction of being the only State level organization to be confined the 'Golden Peacock' award by the Institute of Directors, New Delhi for adopting and maintaining quality management standards in all its operations.

Objectives
Industrial Promotion
Infrastructure Development
Land Acquisition
Project Construction

Accolades

Golden Peacock Innovative Product/Service Award 2018 for Automated Post Allotment Application (APAA)
Highest Cess Deposit Award
Rashtriya Khel Protsahan Purskar Awards 2017 for Development in Sports
Vishwakarma Award 2018 for Best Archived Project of Dr. APJ Abdul Kalam Planetarium and Science and Evolution Park, Sambalpur
Vishwakarma Award 2018 for Best Archived Project of Odisha Crafts Museum, Bhubaneswar  
Vishwakarma Award 2018 for Best Archived Project of Krushi Bhawan, Bhubaneswar
Vishwakarma Award 2018 for Best Maintained Structure of Fortune Towers, Bhubaneswar

References

External links
Official Website of Odisha Industrial Infrastructure Development Corporation (IDCO)

Economy of Odisha
State industrial development corporations of India
State agencies of Odisha
Recipients of the Rashtriya Khel Protsahan Puruskar
Indian companies established in 1981
1981 establishments in Orissa